Milton R. Young Power Plant is a coal-fired power plant in the north central United States, located in Oliver County, North Dakota, southeast of Center. Northwest of Bismarck, it consists of two units which went into service in 1970 and 1977, and have generation capacities of 250 MW and 455 MW, respectively, for the Minnkota Power Cooperative. The used coal comes from surface Center Mine, and the power plant is the startpoint of HVDC Square Butte.

Milton Young (1897–1983) was a six-term U.S. Senator  from the state.

External links
Minnkota Power Cooperative – Milton R. Young Station
Lignite Energy Council – Milton R. Young Station
Center Mine
North Dakota Tourism – Milton R. Young Station

Energy infrastructure completed in 1970
Coal-fired power stations in North Dakota
Buildings and structures in Oliver County, North Dakota